Karen Faye Parker is an American sociologist and criminologist known for her research on urban violence. She is a professor of sociology and criminology at the University of Delaware, where she has worked since 2007. She has also been a research associate at the University of Michigan's National Poverty Center since 2007, and was formerly a professor at the University of Florida before joining the faculty of the University of Delaware.

References

External links
Faculty page

Living people
American criminologists
American women social scientists
University of Delaware faculty
University of Florida faculty
University of North Carolina at Wilmington alumni
North Carolina State University alumni
American women criminologists
Year of birth missing (living people)
American women academics
21st-century American women